The chamber of deputies is the lower house in many bicameral legislatures and the sole house in some unicameral legislatures.

Description
Historically, French Chamber of Deputies was the lower house of the French Parliament during the Bourbon Restoration, the July Monarchy, and the French Third Republic; the name is still informally used for the National Assembly under the nation's current Fifth Republic.

The term "chamber of deputies" is not widely used by English-speaking countries, the more popular equivalent being "House of Representatives", an exception being Burma, a former British colony, where it was the name of the lower house of the country's parliament.  It was also the official description of Dáil Éireann (the lower house of the Irish parliament) during the period of the Irish Free State.

In Malta, the House of Representatives is known, in Maltese, as "Kamra tad-Deputati".
In Lebanon, the literal Arabic name of that country's parliament is Majlis an-Nuwwab, or, "Chamber of Deputies" (although officially used French and English translations are "Assemblée Nationale" and "National Assembly", respectively).

A member of a "chamber of deputies" is generally called a "deputy", the definition of which is similar to that of "congressperson" or "member of parliament". The term "deputy" may refer to any member of a legislative body or chamber; this usage is particularly common in those French-speaking countries whose parliaments are called "national assemblies" and Spanish-speaking countries with legislative bodies called "congresses"; the term is also used by Portugal's Assembly of the Republic. In Ireland, it is used as a form of address when referring to members of Dáil Éireann instead of the Irish language term Teachta Dála, while in the Channel Islands, "Deputy" is used as the official title of most of the members of the States Assembly in Jersey and all but two of the members of the States of Deliberation in Guernsey.

Chamber of Deputies in bicameral legislature
In the following countries, the Chamber of Deputies is part of the bicameral legislature.

Unicameral legislatures

In the following countries, 'Chamber of Deputies' is the name given to the unicameral parliaments :

Defunct chambers of deputies
Burma1 
Congo-Kinshasa1
Ecuador2
Egypt2
Ethiopia1
France1
Czechoslovakia2 3
Iraq1
Italy
Libya1
Nicaragua2
Ottoman Empire
Peru2
Chamber of Deputies of the Portuguese Nation, lower house of the Cortes Gerais1 and Chamber of Deputies of the Portuguese Republic, lower house of the Congress of the Republic1
Sardinia
Venezuela2
Republic of Negros and Republic of Zamboanga (now a region of the Philippines)3
Bahia2
Ceará2
Pernambuco2
São Paulo2

1. Legislature disbanded
2. New constitution, unicameral system adopted
3. Government abolished, absorbed into another country

See also
List of national legislatures
List of legislatures by country
House of Representatives
National Assembly
House of Commons

References

Legislatures